Charles H. Flummerfelt (July 31, 1863 – September 10, 1931) was an American politician in the state of Washington. He served in the Washington House of Representatives and Washington State Senate.

Flummerfelt was born in the Delaware section of Knowlton Township, New Jersey.

References 

Democratic Party members of the Washington House of Representatives
Democratic Party Washington (state) state senators
1863 births
1931 deaths
People from Knowlton Township, New Jersey